Lady Sarah Frances Elizabeth Chatto (née Armstrong-Jones; born 1 May 1964) is a member of the extended British royal family. She is the only daughter of Princess Margaret and Antony Armstrong-Jones, 1st Earl of Snowdon. She and her brother, David Armstrong-Jones, 2nd Earl of Snowdon, are the only maternal first cousins of King Charles III. She is the youngest grandchild of King George VI and Queen Elizabeth The Queen Mother. At her birth, she was seventh in line of succession to the British throne; as of September 2022, she is 27th. Though she does not undertake public duties, she frequently attends events and ceremonies with the wider royal family.

Early life and education
Sarah Armstrong-Jones was born on 1 May 1964 at Kensington Palace in London. She is the second child and only daughter of Princess Margaret and Antony Armstrong-Jones, 1st Earl of Snowdon. She was christened in the private chapel at Buckingham Palace on 13 July 1964.

Lady Sarah is a godmother to Prince Harry, Duke of Sussex, Lady Rose Gilman, and Lady Louise Windsor. She also has half-siblings on her father's side: Polly Fry (born 1960), Lady Frances Armstrong-Jones (born 1979), and Jasper Cable-Alexander (born 1998).

Lady Sarah and her brother, David, then Viscount Linley, grew up in the nursery of Kensington Palace, Apartment 10. They were raised with a nanny called Verona Sumner, although their parents, especially their father, were comparatively hands-on (for the time), with their father teaching them to build things and be creative.

Their parents' marriage was fractious; the couple formally separated when Sarah was 12 and divorced when she was 14. She and her brother spent weekends, depending on with which parent, at either Nymans or Royal Lodge. Holidays were given to the royal estates at Sandringham and Balmoral, where Lady Sarah did a lot of landscape painting.

Lady Sarah was a bridesmaid at the wedding of her cousin Charles, Prince of Wales, and Lady Diana Spencer. She accompanied her mother and brother on an official visit to China and Hong Kong in May 1987.

She attended Bedales School, which she left with a single A level in Art. She enrolled at the Camberwell School of Art. She also studied art at the Royal Academy Schools. She then spent two years in India with her father, where he was employed to photograph the production of A Passage to India. The film's producer, her relative John Knatchbull, 7th Baron Brabourne (son-in-law of Louis Mountbatten, 1st Earl Mountbatten of Burma), gave her a job as an intern assisting the wardrobe department and studying wood gilding under her father's cousin Thomas Messel. Returning to England, she enrolled in a two-year course in textile and fabric design at Middlesex Polytechnic (later renamed as Middlesex University).

Professional life
Chatto has been exhibiting her work, always under the name Sarah Armstrong-Jones, at The Redfern Gallery since 1995. Her work has won awards: the Winsor & Newton Prize in 1988 and the Creswick Landscape Prize in 1990.

In 2004, she became vice president of the Royal Ballet, of which her mother had been president.

Chatto does not undertake public duties and is not considered a "working royal". However, it has been reported that she was close to her aunt Queen Elizabeth II, being the queen's only niece, and remains close to her cousin King Charles III. She is frequently seen attending public events such as jubilees and funerals, as well as semi-private royal family events such as the Sandringham Christmas service with her sons.

Marriage and children

Lady Sarah met Daniel Chatto during her years in India with her father in the 1980s. Chatto was working on another British film, Heat and Dust. He is from a theatrical family, the son of actor Tom Chatto (1920–1982) and the theatrical agent Ros Chatto (born Rosalind Joan Thompson; died 2012). He proposed to her with a "vintage cluster ring."

The couple married on 14 July 1994; the Reverend Chad Varah, founder of the Samaritans, officiated at the wedding, held at St Stephen's, Walbrook in the City of London. The bride's wedding gown was designed by Jasper Conran. Her bridesmaids were all teenagers: her half-sister Lady Frances, Zara Phillips (daughter of her first cousin Princess Anne), and Tara Noble-Singh, a family friend.

The couple have two sons:

Samuel David Benedict Chatto (born 28 July 1996), 28th in the line of succession . He studied at Eton, read history of art at the University of Edinburgh, and works as a sculptor, based in West Sussex. He also completed his yoga teacher training in India.
Arthur Robert Nathaniel Chatto (born 5 February 1999), 29th in the line of succession, and a former page of honour to Queen Elizabeth II, his great-aunt, from 2009 to 2015. He initially attended Westminster Cathedral Choir School before going to Eton College. He then read geography at the University of Edinburgh, and at the same time worked as a personal trainer. As of June 2022, he is serving with the Royal Marines.

References

External links
 

1964 births
Living people
20th-century English painters
20th-century English women artists
21st-century English painters
21st-century English women artists
Sarah
Alumni of Camberwell College of Arts
Alumni of Middlesex University
Sarah
Daughters of British earls
English people of German-Jewish descent
English people of Welsh descent
People educated at Bedales School
People educated at Francis Holland School
People from Kensington
People from Mid Sussex District
People from Windsor, Berkshire
Princess Margaret, Countess of Snowdon